Lindale may refer to a place:

In the United States
 Lindale, Georgia
 Lindale, Ohio
 Lindale, Texas

Elsewhere
 Lindale, Cumbria, England
 Lindale, New Zealand

See also
 Linndale, Ohio
 Lindal-in-Furness, Cumbria, England